With Heart and Hand for the Fatherland (German: Mit Herz und Hand fürs Vaterland) is a 1915 Austrian silent war drama film directed by Jacob Fleck and Luise Fleck and starring Hubert Marischka, Hermann Benke and Liane Haid. The composer Franz Lehár, better known for his operetta, created a score to accompany the film during screenings.

A patriotic story designed to support Austria's war effort during the First World War, it marked the screen debut of actress Liane Haid who went on be a leading screen star.

Plot
A reserve officer in the Tyrolean Rifles leaves his family go and fight on the Italian Front.

Cast
 Hubert Marischka
 Margarete Thumann
 Liane Haid
 Hermann Benke
 Karl Baumgartner
 Franz Felix
 Viktoria Pohl-Meiser
 Polly Janisch
 Louis Seeman
 Max Neufeld
 Hermann Romberg

References

Bibliography
 Robert Von Dassanowsky. Austrian Cinema: A History. McFarland, 2005.

External links

Austro-Hungarian films
1915 films
Austrian silent feature films
Films directed by Jacob Fleck
Films directed by Luise Fleck
Austrian black-and-white films
1910s war drama films
World War I films
Austrian war drama films
1915 drama films
Silent war drama films